Ekova was a French-based musical trio, headed by American-born Dierdre Dubois, who originated the name. "Its roots are in echo, and ova, signifying the feminine side," she explains. "But it's not supposed to have a literal meaning, just a beautiful sound. I wanted a word I'd never heard before." Much of her vocalizations share the linguistic experimentalism/artistry of the group's name, with occasional Celtic, English, and Persian utterances floating in between largely nonsensical syllables, as well as influences from Irish and English folk music.

Discography 
 Space Lullabies and Other Fantasmagore (2001) Soft Breeze & Tsunami Breaks (1999) Heaven's Dust (1998)''

References

External links 
 Six Degrees Records

French musical groups
Six Degrees Records artists